The First Baptist Church is a historic church building in Muskogee, Oklahoma. The church was built in 1903 and was the first church building for the African-American population of Muskogee County. It was built in a Romanesque Revival style. It features two asymmetrical, crenelated towers and a steeply pitched gabled roof. The build is clad in two types of red brick. The two types of brick are separated by a rusticated limestone belt course. The building was listed on the National Register of Historic Places in 1984 for architectural significance and for its importance in local African-American history.

First Baptist "evolved from a mission school founded in 1877 for blacks and Indians".  It is one of four churches included in the Black Protestant Churches of Muskogee Theme Resource study.

Muskogee had a "thriving" black community with a business district of "several retail stores, physicians and attorneys offices, a black-owned bank, and a black newspaper, the Muskogee Cimeter."  The population included 7,831 blacks in 1910 (31% of the total Muskogee population).

References

Oklahoma State Historical Preservation Office entry

External links
 Official page

Churches on the National Register of Historic Places in Oklahoma
Buildings and structures in Muskogee, Oklahoma
National Register of Historic Places in Muskogee County, Oklahoma